Vincetoxicum lineare is an edible species of plant found in arid regions of Australia, it is also known as the bush bean. The habit of the slender plant is a climber or trailer, with stems obtaining a length around two metres. The flowers appear throughout the year, except during February to March, the purple brown colour beginning as a greenish yellow. The margin of the corolla is often hairy, the lobes are deeply divided. Three to seven umbels appear in an axial arrangement, from which a twenty centimetre pod is produced.

The species is noted as an ancient food source of the peoples inhabiting the drier regions of Australia. All parts of the plant are known to edible, but the stem is not regularly consumed. The plant has a low nutritional value, although a source of vitamin C.

References

 

Gentianales of Australia
Edible plants
lineare
Taxa named by Joseph Decaisne